"Yé ké yé ké" is a song by Guinean recording artist Mory Kanté. It was released in 1987 as a single from his third studio album, Akwaba Beach. The song became an international hit; it was one of Africa's best-ever selling hits as well as being a European number one in 1988, making it the first ever African single to sell over one million copies. The song was a top five hit in France, Switzerland, Germany and the Netherlands, where it topped the chart for two weeks. A remix, the "Afro Acid Mix" was especially made for UK release, where it reached No. 25. In 1994, German techno duo Hardfloor remixed the song and released this new version with moderate success. A Bollywood song, "Tamma Tamma Loge", also used the music in this song.

Background and lyrics
The lyrics are in Mandinka. Kanté adapted it from a traditional song called "Yekeke." "All good things have many owners," said Kanté in a 1997 interview. He added that "the song comes from a wonderful tradition we have in the villages. You know, when young girls are approaching the age of marriage, they flirt with each other through music. They court and ensnare each other through their songs and dances. These are sweet songs, I swear. 'Yekeke' is one of them. It's the sound that young women make when they dance ... It's their way of communicating their interest."

Critical reception
A review in Music & Media stated that it was easy to understand why it was a hit, as it is "a festive and very rhythmic chant, with stirring vocals wrapped in an unbridled, energetic production".

Impact and legacy
English DJ, producer and broadcaster Dave Pearce included "Yé ké yé ké" in his all-time top 10 in 1997, saying, "A classic that always evokes a strong reaction—a real feel-good track that works well as a transformation track when following on from someone else's set. I play it all the time."

Track listings

 7-inch single
 "Yé ké yé ké" – 3:58
 "Akwaba Beach" – 5:11

 12-inch maxi
 "Yé ké yé ké" (remix) – 6:17
 "Akwaba Beach" – 5:11
 "Yé ké yé ké" – 3:58

 12-inch maxi – US
 "Yé ké yé ké" (French remix) – 6:17
 "Yé ké yé ké" (Afro acid mix) – 5:25
 "Yé ké yé ké" (Mory's house version) – 5:25
 "Yé ké yé ké" (French edit) – 3:38
 "Akwaba Beach" – 5:11

 12-inch maxi – UK
 "Yé ké yé ké" (the Afro acid remix) (*engineered by Robin Guthrie)
 "Akwaba Beach"
 "Yé ké yé ké" (the French remix)

 CD single
 "Yé ké yé ké" (remix) – 6:20
 "Akwaba Beach" – 5:14
 "Yé ké yé ké" (live) – 7:17

Charts

Weekly charts
Original version

1995 version

1996 remix

Year-end charts

Popular culture

Asia
Due to the international popularity of the song, Cantopop singer Priscilla Chan recorded a cover version (地球大追蹤) on her 1988 album, Autumn Colours (秋色) . In September 1989, the song appeared in a television commercial for the second generation Toyota Carina ED in Japan.

The song was also popular in India. "Yé ké yé ké" was used as background music in the 1990 Bollywood film Agneepath, inspired the Bollywood song "Tamma Tamma" in the 1990 film Thanedaar, and inspired the song "Pellikala Vachesindhe" in the 1997 Telugu film Preminchukundam Raa.

Greece
A Greek-language parody of Yé ké yé ké, titled Ελλάδα Είναι Μόνο Μία (There is only one Greece), was recorded by Harry Klynn for his 1989 political comedy album Ραντεβού Με Την... Εισαγγελία (Date with the...Prosecutor).  In contrast to Mory Kanté's original subject of doting on a love interest, Klynn's parody version discusses various political issues present in Greece during the late 1980s such as the Davos process for reconciliation between Greece and Turkey.  In particular, the main chorus of the original is replaced by "Our (vulgar expletive for female genitalia) is burning, it's burning" to imply the lack of action on the part of the government in power at the time.

Italy
In 1987 the Italian producer (and Media Records boss) Gianfranco Bortolotti released a medley under his Club House alias, with "Yé ké yé ké" being mixed up with "I'm a Man", a song originally recorded by The Spencer Davis Group and also known from the version recorded by Chicago (Chicago Transit Authority). In 1989, Club House's medley was licensed from Media in Italy to Music Man Records in the UK and became a small hit, peaking at number 69 in the British charts.

References

External links
 Translation of lyrics

Mory Kanté songs
1987 songs
1988 singles
Barclay (record label) singles
Dutch Top 40 number-one singles
European Hot 100 Singles number-one singles
London Records singles
Number-one singles in Belgium
Number-one singles in Finland
Number-one singles in Greece
Number-one singles in Spain
World music songs